"Pop Singer" is the debut single from London-based glam rockers Rachel Stamp. It was released in February, 1996 through WEA. The single was released as a 2 track CD single and limited edition pink 7" vinyl of 1000 copies. A promo video was also made for the single's release.

CD single and 7" Vinyl 
Released February 26, 1996
(WEA036CD/WEA036)

Track listing
 Pop Singer
 Sluts & Sharks

Facts 
 The band’s debut single through WEA Records
 Released on CD and Limited Edition Pink 7" Vinyl of 1000 copies
 The CD’s label has a special print, which makes it look glittery under the light
 The 7” features an extended intro to “Pop Singer”
 The 7" also has "Lick It Up Baby, Lick It Up" etched on to the center ring of Side A and "Christ On A Bike" on Side B!

"Pop Singer" Promo CD single
Released February 1996
(WEA036CDDJ)

Track listing 
 Pop Singer (radio edit)

Facts 
 The promo single features a radio edit of "Pop Singer" featuring a slightly different mix of the song as well as all of the swearing removed
 Received one airplay on Virgin Radio when Chris Evans mistook the single for a Spice Girls CD on his morning radio show

Promotional video

 The promotional video for "Pop Singer" was directed by Max and Dania and filmed in early 1996.
 The video was rarely played on TV and remains in the WEA vaults
 David Ryder-Prangley: "Pop Singer" was directed by MAX and DANIA who also made FIVE's 'everybody get up'. As far as i know this never got shown anywhere and features myself, will, cliff harris and mike rowe. i don't have a copy. i generally hate our videos..." (taken from a Rachel Stamp fansite interview, 2004)

References

External links
Pop Singer Promo Video on Facebook

Rachel Stamp songs
1996 debut singles
Song recordings produced by Dave Eringa
1996 songs
Warner Music Group singles